The Pășcănia is a left tributary of the river Bahlueț in Romania. It flows into the Bahlueț in Giurgești.

References

Rivers of Romania
Rivers of Iași County